The  (corporately styled as N-ONE) is a retro styled kei car produced by Honda for the Japanese market. It was previewed at the 2011 Tokyo Motor Show and went on sale on 1 November 2012. Together with the N-Box, N-WGN and N-Van, is part of the renewed N lineup of kei class city cars from Honda. The use of the letter "N" in the name was previously used for the late 1960s and 1970s N360.



First generation (JG1/2; 2012) 

The N-One was introduced in 2012 as a newer addition to Honda's kei car lineup in Japan. It features styling reminiscent of the 1969–1972 N360 and incorporates Honda's DOHC three-cylinder engine with a continuously variable transmission, which was launched in 2011 with the N-Box. It is marketed as an upmarket vehicle in the kei class and incorporates standard features uncommon for its class.

Second generation (JG3/4; 2020) 

The second-generation N-One went on sale in November 2020.

Awards 
Honda N-One won "K Car of the year award" at Japan Car of the Year 2021-2022

References

External links 

 

N-One
Cars introduced in 2012
2020s cars
Kei cars
Hatchbacks
Front-wheel-drive vehicles
All-wheel-drive vehicles
Vehicles with CVT transmission
Retro-style automobiles